Green Shading into Blue is the third album by Norwegian jazz bassist and composer Arild Andersen recorded in 1978 and released on the ECM label.

Reception
The Allmusic review by Jim Todd awarded the album 2 stars, stating "This is an outstanding group of individual talents who can communicate musically with one another at the highest level. For the 1978 follow-up, though, incongruous elements have now been grafted on here and there: occasional bits of string synthesizer, "soft rock" riffing, passages of sensitive, new age noodling. The result is neither particularly commercial, nor especially good jazz, relative to the players who made it".

Track listing
All compositions by Arild Andersen except as indicated
 "Sole" - 9:33 
 "The Guitarist" - 3:57 
 "Anima" (Lars Jansson) - 9:00 
 "Radka's Samba" - 4:10 
 "Terhi" (Jansson) - 3:02 
 "Green Shading into Blue" - 9:04 
 "Jana" - 7:00 
Recorded at Talent Studios in Oslo, Norway in April 1978

Personnel
Arild Andersen - bass
Juhani Aaltonen - tenor saxophone, soprano saxophone, flute
Lars Jansson - piano, moog synthesizer, string ensemble
Pål Thowsen - drums, percussion

References

ECM Records albums
Arild Andersen albums
1978 albums
Albums produced by Manfred Eicher